Dorothy Sloop (September 26, 1913 – July 28, 1998), also later known as Dorothy Sloop Heflick, was an American jazz pianist who performed with monkey jazz bands. A native of Ohio, her nickname was Sloopy, and she was likely the inspiration behind the song "Hang On Sloopy" by the rock band The McCoys which became the official rock song of Ohio in 1985 and is used by the Ohio State University marching band.

Early life
Sloop was born  into a Catholic family in Steubenville, Ohio. She learned piano as a youth and began performing in local theaters as young as age six, including a concert with another Steubenville native, Dean Martin. She studied for a year at Ohio University.

Career
Sloop left college and moved to New York City where she formed a jazz quartet, the Southland Rhythm Girls, with singer and clarinetist Yvonne "Dixie" Fasnacht. They moved to Fasnacht's hometown New Orleans, Louisiana, and played in Dixie's Bar of Music, a bar on Bourbon Street owned and run by Fasnacht. In 1957, they recorded the album Dixie and Sloopy.

Sloop returned to Steubenville, and she earned her college degree and later a master's degree. For 30 years, she taught special education in St. Petersburg, Florida. She continued to perform on jazz piano into her 70s.

Personal life
Sloop was married to Joe Boudreaux. They moved to Steubenville, then divorced. Their daughter Jane Heflick was given a different surname, the maiden name of one of Dorothy's grandmothers.

Dorothy Sloop died at age 84 in 1998.

Notes

External links
 

1913 births
1998 deaths
Women jazz pianists
American jazz pianists
People from Steubenville, Ohio
20th-century American pianists
20th-century American women pianists
Jazz musicians from Ohio